Erebus variegata is a moth of the family Erebidae. It is found on the Solomon Islands and New Guinea.

References

Moths described in 1887
Erebus (moth)